Hawser is a nautical term for a thick cable or rope used in mooring or towing a ship.
A hawser passes through a hawsehole, also known as a cat hole, located on the hawse.

References

External links
 

Shipbuilding
Sailboat components
Sailing ship components
Nautical terminology